Köseuşağı is a village in the Çelikhan District, Adıyaman Province, Turkey. The village is populated by Kurds of the Reşwan tribe and had a population of 165 in 2021.

The hamlet of Yağmurlu is attached to Köseuşağı.

References

Villages in Çelikhan District
Kurdish settlements in Adıyaman Province